George Michael Rosener (May 26, 1884 – March 29, 1945) was an American film actor and writer. He also wrote and acted in the Frank Buck serial Jungle Menace.

Career
Rosener began his acting career at age 19 as a circus clown, followed by stints in tent and medicine shows, vaudeville, and stock companies. He was a playwright whose 1927 play Speakeasy (written with Edward Knoblock) was adapted for film in 1929. Rosener acted in or directed more than 200 plays, including My Maryland. He was on the news staff of the New York World.

He worked for the Shubert family, operators of the Broadway theater district, for more than seven years as an actor, director, and writer. He also acted in 38 films and wrote 14 more, including Doctor X, Union Depot, The Secret of Treasure Island, City of Missing Girls, The Mysterious Pilot, Alias the Doctor, The Great Adventures of Wild Bill Hickok, Sinners' Holiday, New Faces of 1937, House of Secrets, The Carson City Kid, Abe Lincoln in Illinois, and The Great Commandment.

Work with Frank Buck
In 1937, Rosener wrote and acted in the Frank Buck serial Jungle Menace.

Final years
Rosener's last film credit was in 1941. His wife, Adele, died in June 1942. George Rosener died three years later.

Partial filmography

Sinners' Holiday (1930, dialogue)
The Doorway to Hell (1930, screenplay) - Slick (uncredited)
She Got What She Wanted (1930, screenplay)
Union Depot (1932) - Dr. Bernardi
Alias the Doctor (1932) - Dr. Franz von Bergman
Doctor X (1932) - Otto
70,000 Witnesses (1932) - Ortello
Madison Square Garden (1932) - Crooked Fight Manager (uncredited)
The Devil Is Driving (1932) - The Dummy
The Circus Queen Murder (1933) - John T. Rainey
Goodbye Love (1933, screenplay)
The Test (1935) - Trapper (uncredited)
House of Secrets (1936) - Hector Munson
The Case of the Black Cat (1936) - Charles Ashton
Ellis Island (1936) - Uncle Ted Kedrich
Park Avenue Logger (1937) - Matt O'Shea
New Faces of 1937 (1937) - Doorman
Super-Sleuth (1937) - Policeman
The Big Shot (1937) - Phillips - the Accountant (uncredited)
Jungle Menace (1937, Serial) - The Professor
The Mysterious Pilot (1937, Serial) - Fritz [Chs.3-5,9,14-15]
Sh! The Octopus (1937) - Captain Hook
The Secret of Treasure Island (1938, Serial) - Capt. Samuel Cuttle
The Great Adventures of Wild Bill Hickok (1938, screenplay)
Flying G-Men (1939, Serial) - Hopkins (uncredited)
Confessions of a Nazi Spy (1939) - Klauber
They All Come Out (1939) - Barney (uncredited)
In Name Only (1939) - Dr. Hastings at Hotel (uncredited)
5th Ave Girl (1939) - Hobo in Park (uncredited)
The Great Commandment (1939) - Merchant
Hitler – Beast of Berlin (1939) - Wunderlich
Three Sons (1939) - Man Taking Cigarette Butt (uncredited)
Joe and Ethel Turp Call on the President (1939) - Mr. Belknap (uncredited)
Abe Lincoln in Illinois (1940) - Dr. Chandler
Florian (1940) - Riding School Inspector (uncredited)
The Carson City Kid (1940) - Judge Tucker
Colorado (1940) - Secret Service Official (uncredited)
Victory (1940) - Dutch Clerk (uncredited)
So Ends Our Night (1941) - Custom Guard (uncredited)
Arkansas Judge (1941) - Mr. Beaudry
 I'll Sell My Life (1941, screenplay)
City of Missing Girls (1941, screenplay) - Officer Dugan
In Old Cheyenne (1941) - Sam Drummond
Sheriff of Tombstone (1941) - Official (uncredited) (final film role)

References

External links

 

1884 births
1945 deaths
American male screenwriters
American male stage actors
American circus performers
Writers from Brooklyn
20th-century American male actors
American male dramatists and playwrights
20th-century American dramatists and playwrights
20th-century American male writers
Screenwriters from New York (state)
20th-century American screenwriters